Zemiathrips is a genus of thrips in the family Phlaeothripidae.

Species
 Zemiathrips anatolis
 Zemiathrips biseta
 Zemiathrips greensladeae
 Zemiathrips triseta
 Zemiathrips uptoni

References

Phlaeothripidae
Thrips
Thrips genera
Taxa named by Laurence Alfred Mound